Melanocyte protein PMEL also known as premelanosome protein (PMEL) or silver locus protein homolog (SILV) is a protein that in humans is encoded by the PMEL gene. Its gene product may be referred to as PMEL, silver, ME20, gp100 or Pmel17.

Structure and function 
PMEL is a 100 kDa type I transmembrane glycoprotein that is expressed primarily in pigment cells of the skin and eye. The transmembrane form of PMEL is modified in the secretory pathway by elaboration of N-linked oligosaccharides and addition and modification of O-linked oligosaccharides. It is then targeted to precursors of the pigment organelle, the melanosome, where it is proteolytically processed to several small fragments. Some of these fragments form non-pathological amyloid that assemble into sheets and form the striated pattern that underlies melanosomal ultrastructure. PMEL cleavage is mediated by several proteases including a proprotein convertase of the furin family, a "sheddase" that might include members of the a disintegrin and metalloproteinase (ADAM) family, and additional proteases in melanosomes or their precursors. After the amyloidogenic region is cleaved, the small remaining integral membrane fragment is digested by γ-secretase.

The expression of the PMEL gene is regulated by the microphthalmia-associated transcription factor (MITF).

References

Further reading

External links